The Austro-Hungarian Eleventh Army was an Austro-Hungarian field army that fought during World War I.

Actions 
The Eleventh Army was formed in March 1916 on the Italian Front, where it remained active until the end of the War. 
It participated in the 
 Battle of Asiago (May - June 1916)
 Battle of Mount Ortigara (June 1917)
 Battle of Caporetto (October - November 1917)
 Battle of the Piave River (June 1918)
 Battle of Vittorio Veneto (October–November 1918)

Commanders
 Viktor Dankl (14 March 1916 – 18 June 1916)
 Franz Rohr von Denta (18 June 1916 – 28 February 1917)
 Viktor von Scheuchenstuel (28 February 1917 – 3 November 1918)

Sources 

 Austro-Hungarian Army, Higher Commands and Commanders

Field armies of Austria-Hungary
1916 establishments in Austria-Hungary
Military units and formations established in 1916
Military units and formations disestablished in 1918